Chitré is a city and corregimiento, the capital of the Panamanian province of Herrera.
with a population of 9,092 as of 2010, and a metropolitan area population of 80,000 inhabitants. It is also the seat of Chitré District. 
Chitré is located about 7 km inland from the Gulf of Panama on the Azuero Peninsula. The name Chitré comes from the native  tribe Chitra. In the city, there is a district, also called Chitré, which is subdivided into five corregimientos.  The corregimientos are San Juan Bautista, Llano Bonito, Monagrillo, La Arena and Chitré.

History
Chitré was founded on October 19, 1848 as a parochial district (distrito parroquial). The Provincial Chamber of Panama ordered in their Article 1, inscription 4 to organize Chitre as a Parroquial District, in the County of Los Santos, this district was to include the towns of Chitré, Monagrillo and La Arena, separate from Los Santos District. Chitré's founders are said to be Ventura Solís, Matías Rodríguez, José Ríos, José María Benavidez, Ildelfonso Pérez, Blas Tello, Eugenio Barrera, José Burgos, and Carlos Rodríguez.

When Herrera Province was created in 1915, Chitré was named its capital. In 1941, during the presidency of Arnulfo Arias Madrid, Herrera Province was joined with Los Santos Province, with Chitré as the joint province's capital. During the presidency of Ricardo Adolfo de la Guardia the two provinces were again separated (as they are today), with Chitré as the provincial capital of Herrera.

On October 19, 1948, the city had a large centennial celebration. For its commemoration, a street was renamed Avenida Centenario. Its population, as of 1990, was 21,726; its population, as of 2000, was 7,756. In 2016, the city was visited by Miss Universe 2015 Pia Wurtzbach of the Philippines.

Geography
The natural vegetation of the region is tropical dry forest, although most of the forest has been cut down.

Chitre has a nearby beach called Agallito. During low tide, many types of crabs come out, and thousands of birds of different species come to eat. This makes for an ideal birdwatching and photography condition. The ornithologist Francisco Delgado, discoverer of the Painted Parakeet of Azuero, resides in Chitré.

Herrera borders on the north with Cocle, on the south with Los Santos, north/northeast with Veraguas and east with the Pacific Ocean (Parita Bay). The Santa Maria river acts as a border with Cocle while the La Villa river performs the same function on the border with Los Santos. It is located on the Azuero Peninsula, place that shares with Los Santos and part of Veraguas.

The most important towns in Herrera are Chitre, Parita, Ocu, Las Minas, Los Pozos and Santa Maria in that order more or less. It is a very lively place during the yearly carnivals. Herrera, like the other central provinces, is best known for its artisanal products, in particular clay pottery. These can be found in many places along the road such as the one depicted here in the town of La Arena.

Economy and transportation

Chitré has many amenities and conveniences similar to Panama City like: hotels, restaurants with national and international food, banks, stores, internet access, multilevel malls, telecommunication systems, etc. It is one of Panama highest developed cities and one of the most industrialized ones which provides the country and part of the continent with fuels, meats and clothes.

The city of Chitré "has become the commercial center for the central provinces of the country." Credit cards, such as Visa, MasterCard and American Express are accepted in almost every shopping mall, grocery stores, supermarkets, pharmacies, restaurants, hotels and car rental agencies.

The city has cheaper shops and markets, all located in the city's downtown, along with trading places and sale stores, it also has a plaza and some factories, of service, Heavy and touristic based industry.

In alignment with the growth of the city the Cubitá Boutique Resort & Spa is currently in construction. There will be 100 rooms in the hotel and it shares the property with 64 residential apartments, 26 houses, a Chapel and commercial plaza. The hotel expects to open its doors to the public in 2013.

There is a large regional bus terminal in Chitré; destinations include Las Minas, Las Tablas, Los Posos, Ocú, Panama City, Pesé, Santiago, and Tonosí. Chitré's small airport offers flights to Panama City on Air Panama.

Culture
The Chitreans are friendly and cheerful by themselves. They celebrate and fully enjoy parties with people even if they aren't from the town. 
The cooperation and good dealing are the rule and not the exception for Chitre people. Chitre city is a result of that statement and it is very peaceful and secure, which makes this city a paradise for retired people who want to live away from big disturbing cities.

The carnival celebrations in the city are well-known worldwide. It's one of the most famous in the country and are held every year in February, receiving overseas people and non-residents of the city from other Panama provinces. The Holy Week, Corpus Christi, and St. John the Baptist, patron saint of the city, are also famous celebrations domestically.

Province pride is played every summer in the Baseball championships. Chitre host whole matches of the province at Rico Cedeno Stadium. The historical success on National championships made us as one of the most winning provinces in this sport, who is the most important not only in Chitre city or Herrera province area even in whole country.

The last title was obtained in 2007, when Herrera was triple champion from 2005 to 2007.

Education
For much of its history, Chitré did not have its own elementary school. In these times, classes (separated by gender) were taught in rented houses in the town. The Chitré School (Escuela de Chitré), later called Republic of Bolivia School (Escuela República de Bolivia), was built in 1928 using funds contributed by the Panamanian government and by local residents. In 1934, the building that would house the prestigious Tomás Herrera School (Escuela Tomás Herrera) was built. The parish priest, Presbyter Melitón Martín Villalta, blessed the ceremony. The school's first director was Arcadio Castillero. The Hipólito Pérez Tello School (Escuela Hipólito Pérez Tello), also an elementary school, operated in the Tomás Herrera building in its early days.

The José Daniel Crespo School (Colegio José Daniel Crespo), a secondary school, was long the only secondary school to serve Chitré and Villa de Los Santos. It is among the best public secondary schools in the country. The Padre Segundo Familiar Cano School (Colegio Padre Segundo Familiar Cano), called Monagrillo Secondary School (Colegio Secundario de Monagrillo) since 2007, is also located in Chitré. It was founded in 1970 and is now has a national reputation as an excellent school.

There are also many private schools in Chitré, including the Colegio Agustiniano, a Roman Catholic private school and Soyuz Bilingual School.

The University of Panama has a site in Chitré, as do the Latin University of Panama and Columbus University.

Notable people from Chitré
Sheila E. Lichacz, international artist and diplomat (ambassador-at-large, Panama)
Enrique Geenzier, poet, politician, and diplomat
Ricaurte Arrocha Adames (Chitré 1939 - ), doctor, surgeon, and writer
Annabel Miguelena writer, lawyer, actress
Emilio Regueira, musician, bandleader (Los Rabanes)
Félix Danilo Gómez (Flex), musician
Juan Ramón Solís, football player
Massiel Rodríguez, journalist
César Anel Rodríguez, journalist and television presenter
Sandra Sandoval, singer
Samy Sandoval, accordionist
Álvaro Álvarado, television presenter
Gisela Tuñón, television presenter
Christian Torres, musician in Los Rabanes
Ignacio Isola, robotics pioneer
Javier Saavedra, musician in Los Rabanes
Mirtha Rodríguez, radio and television presenter
Oscar Poveda, television presenter
Andres "Ito" Poveda, humorist
Sebastian Mendoza, entrepreneur and community organizer
Francisco Antonio Narváez, international loss adjuster
Sheldry Sáez, Miss Panama Universe 2011 and top 10 in Miss Universe 2011
Olmedo Sáenz, former Major League Baseball player

References

Populated places in Herrera Province
Populated places established in 1848
1848 establishments in the Republic of New Granada
Corregimientos of Herrera Province